Xavier Manuel (born March 20, 1987) is a former arena football player. He most recently played for the Iowa Barnstormers of the Arena Football League. And a math and science teacher at champman middle school

References 

1987 births
Living people
Alabama A&M Bulldogs football players
Colorado Crush (IFL) players
Iowa Barnstormers players